Chiniot is a city in Punjab, Pakistan

Chiniot may also refer to:

 Chiniot Bridge, bridge across Chenab river, Chiniot, Pakistan
 Chiniot District, a district in Punjab, Pakistan
 Chiniot General Hospital, hospital in Karachi, Pakistan
 Chiniot Railway Station, a railway station in Pakistan
 Chiniot Tehsil, a tehsil in Pakistan
 Ilyas Chinioti, politician
 Jhang-Chiniot Road, a highway road connecting Jhang and Chiniot

See also